

List of Ambassadors

Ron Adam (diplomat) 2019 - 
Belaynesh Zevadia 
Aharon Ofri (Non-Resident, Kampala) 1968 - 1971
Chargé d'affaires a.i Meir Joffe
Uri Lubrani (Non-Resident, Kampala) 1965 - 1967
Chargé d'affaires a.i Aryeh Levin (diplomat)
Michael Michael (diplomat) (Non-Resident, Kampala) 1962 - 1965

References

Rwanda
Israel